Elfriede Martha Blauensteiner (22 January 1931 – 18 November 2003), dubbed The Black Widow, was an Austrian serial killer who murdered at least three victims by poison. In each case, she inherited the victim's possessions.

Crimes 

On 7 March 1997, Blauensteiner was found guilty of murdering 77-year-old Alois Pichler and sentenced to life imprisonment. Her former lawyer Harald Schmidt was jailed for seven years for being an accomplice to grievous bodily harm and for forging the will of Alois Pichler. She was a gambling addict and it is believed that she would deliberately date rich elderly men and poison them before gambling away the money which had been left to her in their fabricated wills. Four years later, she was found guilty of murdering her 64-year-old husband Friedrick Doecker and 84-year-old female neighbour Franziska Koeberl. Although she was only convicted of a total of three murders, Austrian police believe that she may have murdered at least 10 people. Keoberl is believed to have been her only female victim.

After serving less than seven years of her life sentence, Blauensteiner died from a brain tumor on 18 November 2003 in a Vienna hospital. She was cremated at Feuerhalle Simmering, where also her ashes were buried.

See also
List of medical and pseudo-medical serial killers

References
Peter Vronsky: "Female Serial Killers: How and Why Women Become Monsters”, Berkley Books, New York (2007), p. 439

External links
Mayhem Net

1931 births
2003 deaths
Austrian female murderers
Austrian female serial killers
Austrian people convicted of murder
Austrian people who died in prison custody
Austrian prisoners sentenced to life imprisonment
Burials at Feuerhalle Simmering
Deaths from brain cancer in Austria
Mariticides
People convicted of murder by Austria
Poisoners
Prisoners sentenced to life imprisonment by Austria
Prisoners who died in Austrian detention
Serial killers who died in prison custody